David J. Dausey is an American epidemiologist, professor and academic administrator.  He is the Provost of Duquesne University in Pittsburgh, Pennsylvania. He was formerly the Provost of Mercyhurst University in Erie, Pennsylvania. Prior to Mercyhurst, Dausey was a professor at Carnegie Mellon University in Pittsburgh, Pennsylvania, where he maintains an honorary faculty appointment as a Distinguished Service Professor.  Dausey was also Policy Researcher at the RAND Corporation.

Education 
Dausey received a bachelor's degree in psychology from Mercyhurst University. Dausey received his master's degree in epidemiology and public health from the Yale School of Public Health and his doctoral degree in epidemiology and public health from the Yale Graduate School of Arts and Sciences.  While at Yale, Dausey served as a senator for the Graduate and Professional Student Senate. He completed post graduate training in higher education management and leadership at the Harvard Kennedy School and the Harvard Graduate School of Education.

Career

Economic development 
Dausey was the founding Chairman of the Board of the Erie Innovation District, a Limited Liability Company (LLC) designed to create jobs and stimulate economic growth in Erie, Pennsylvania. The focus of the Erie Innovation District is to incubate and accelerate businesses focused on data science and cybersecurity. The overarching plan is to turn Erie, Pennsylvania into an innovation hub for cyber. Dausey led the search team for the President and CEO for the Erie Innovation District.  In September 2017, Karl Sanchack was hired to fulfill this role. Joe NeCastro, formerly the Chief Financial and Administrative Officer of Scripps Networks, replaced Dausey as Chair in May 2018.

Epidemiology 
Dausey was appointed a fellow of the American College of Epidemiology in 2012. Dausey's research on public health systems received international attention when it called into question the preparedness of U.S. public health agencies to respond to major emergencies. Dausey is a commentator on public health topics for television news providers including CNN, BBC, and Canadian Television . and radio news providers including NPR, BBC and Beijing Today. He is a guest writer on public health topics for newspapers including USA Today, the Washington Post, the Pittsburgh Post-Gazette, and the Buffalo News.

Academia

Teaching 
Dausey began his teaching career at Yale University where he was a teaching fellow.  He was a Clinical Assistant Professor at the University of Pittsburgh before moving to Carnegie Mellon University where he became a Distinguished Service Professor of Health Policy and Management. His teaching at Carnegie Mellon focused on health systems, health policy, program evaluation and epidemiology. Dausey was a tenured full professor at Mercyhurst in the Zurn College of Natural and Health Sciences. He is a tenured full professor at Duquesne University in the John G. Rangos School of Health Sciences.

Academic Administration 
Dausey began his career in academic administration as the Senior Director of Health Programs and Initiatives Carnegie Mellon University. In this capacity, he oversaw three master's degree programs, three master's degree concentrations, three joint undergraduate/graduate degree programs, and a health focused doctoral program. Dausey grew and expanded the academic programs at Carnegie Mellon focused on health by creating partnerships with community organizations. Dausey left Carnegie Mellon to join Mercyhurst University to become the Founding Chair and Professor of the Department of Public Health. Dausey later became Founding Director of the Mercyhurst Institute of Public Health. Dausey was appointed the Founding Dean of the School of Health Professions and Public Health at Mercyhurst, which eventually grew to become the Zurn College of Natural and Health Sciences. Dausey became the Provost of Mercyhurst University in 2015. He left this position in 2018 to assume the role of Provost of Duquesne University.

Author 
Dausey is the author of two books Tests to Evaluate Public Health Disease Reporting Systems and Evaluation of the Arkansas Tobacco Settlement Program.

Personal life 
Dausey was born on June 13, 1975 in Pittsburgh, Pennsylvania to Daniel and Jody Dausey.  He currently lives in Pittsburgh, Pennsylvania with his wife, Nichole, and their two boys, Daniel and Elijah.  Dausey is an avid runner and was a varsity athlete while in college.  He served as the captain of the  Mercyhurst Cross County team from 1995–1997.

References 

1975 births
Harvard Graduate School of Education alumni
Mercyhurst University
Carnegie Mellon University faculty
Living people
Yale School of Public Health alumni
Harvard Kennedy School alumni
Fellows of the American College of Epidemiology
21st-century American scientists